Counterpane may refer to:

 Counterpane (bedding)
 BT Counterpane, an information technology company